Bultong  is the Ifugao name for their sport of traditional wrestling. It is often played during town and provincial fiestas. Bultong falls under the international classification of belt wrestling.

Notables 

Two Ifugao bultong champions who also excelled and became famous in other combat sports are:

 Ronald Bingwaoel – former member of the Philippine sanshou team and one of Asia's best sanshou fighters in the 1990s. He also became a Universal Reality Combat Championship mixed martial arts (MMA) fighter, winning his match in URCC 2 in April 2003. 
 Jason Balabal – current Philippine wrestling team member and 2009 Southeast Asian Games gold medalist in freestyle wrestling, 84 kilogram division.

Sanshou gives points for wrestling take-downs, aside from kicks and punches, but does not allow ground fighting.

References

Further reading 
Barton, R. F. "Ifugao Law" University of California Publications on American Archeology and Ethnology. The Internet Archive. February 15, 1919 
Sevilla III, Karlo Silverio. Interview with Erlinda Napiloy, Sports Director, Ifugao State University. Conducted in March 2007. 
Sevilla III, Karlo Silverio. Interview with Jason Balabal. Conducted in December 2007. 
 Sevilla III, Karlo Silverio. Interview with Melvin Sia, Bultong Photographer, January 2008. 
Sevilla III, Karlo Silverio. Interview with Juan Alberto Balde, President, Wrestling Association of the Philippines. Conducted in September 1998. 
Mallari, Perry Gil."FMA CORNER: Various forms of Filipino Indigenous Wrestling" FMApulse.com,November 23, 2009.http://www.fmapulse.com/content/fma-corner-various-forms-filipino-indigenous-wrestling?page=1. 
7."Pacific Island Traditional Wrestling." Coreeda Association of Australia. http://www.coreedaoz.com/main/page_pacific_island_traditional_wrestling.html (Accessed on December 13, 2010) 
&"Belt wrestling." Olympic Council of Asia, 2009. https://web.archive.org/web/20100613032921/http://ocasia.org/Sports/SportsT.aspx?GSCode=125 (Accessed on January 15, 2011)

See also 

 Filipino Martial Arts
 Buno
 Dumog

Philippine martial arts
Sports in Ifugao
Wrestling in the Philippines
Folk wrestling styles